Vasakronan is a Swedish real estate company. Formerly wholly government-owned, it is now owned in equal shares by the First, Second, Third and Fourth Swedish national pension funds.

Vasakronan is one of the largest real estate companies in Sweden, and has operations in Stockholm, the Stockholm suburbs, Gothenburg, Malmö and Uppsala.

In 2008, Vasakronan merged with AP Fastigheter.  The company operates under the Vasakronan name today.

Properties
Kista Science Tower
Lilla Bommen
Hötorgshus 1,2,3 and 4

References

Government-owned companies of Sweden
Real estate companies of Sweden